The Archdiocese of Corfu, Zakynthos, and Cefalonia is a Latin Church ecclesiastical territory or archdiocese of the Catholic Church comprising the Ionian islands of Corfu, Zakynthos and Cephalonia in western Greece.

History
 1310: Established as Diocese of Corfù
 June 3, 1919: Promoted as Metropolitan Archdiocese of Corfu – Zakynthos – Cephalonia

Leadership
 Archbishops of Corfu, Zakynthos and Cephalonia
 Archbishop Giorgios Altouvas (since 14 September 2020)
 Archbishop Yannis Spiteris, O.F.M. Cap. (22 March 2003 – 14 September 2020)
 Archbishop Antonios Varthalitis, A.A. (1962.05.30 – 2003.03.22)
 Archbishop Antonio Gregorio Vuccino, A.A. (1947.05.29 – 1952.07.06)
 Fr. Giovanni Dalla Vecchia (Apostolic Administrator 1941–1944)
 Archbishop Leonard Brindisi (1919.07.03 – 1940.09.08)
 Bishops of Corfu 
 Archbishop Domenico Darmanin (1912.03.04 – 1919.02.17)
 Archbishop Teodoro Antonio Polito (? – 1911.09.23)
 Archbishop Antonio Delenda (1898.03.24 – 1900.08.20)
 Bishop Evangelista Boni, O.F.M. Cap. (1885.01.11 – ?)
 Bishop Francis Joseph Nicholson, O.C.D. (1852.05 – 1855.04.30)
 Patriarch Daulus Augustus Foscolo (1816.03.08 – 1830.03.15)
 Patriarch Francesco Maria Fenzi (1779.09.20 – 1816.09.23)
 Cardinal Angelo Maria Quirini, O.S.B.Cas. (1723.11.22 – 1727.07.30)
 Cardinal Marcantonio Barbarigo (1678.06.06 – 1687.07.07)

See also
Roman Catholicism in Greece

References

Sources
 GCatholic.org
 Catholic Hierarchy
 Diocese website

Roman Catholic dioceses in Greece
Religious organizations established in the 1310s
1310 establishments in Europe
Roman Catholic Archdiocese
Roman Catholic Archdiocese
Roman Catholic Archdiocese
Roman Catholic dioceses established in the 14th century